DLA Piper is a multinational law firm with offices in over 40 countries throughout the Americas, Asia Pacific, Europe, Africa, and the Middle East. In 2021, it had a total revenue of US$3.47 billion, an average profit per equity partner of US$2.5 million, and was the third largest law firm in the United States as measured by revenue.

DLA Piper was formed in January 2005 by a merger between three law firms: San Diego-based Gray Cary Ware & Freidenrich LLP, Baltimore-based Piper Rudnick LLP and United Kingdom-based DLA LLP. It is composed of two partnerships, the United Kingdom-based DLA Piper International LLP and the United States-based DLA Piper LLP (US). The two partnerships share a single global board and are structured as a Swiss Verein.

History

Origins

DLA Piper's origins can be traced back to Thomas Townend Dibb (1807–1875) and Sir Charles Lupton OBE (1855–1935).

The founder of the firm was born in Leeds in 1807, the son of a physician. He was educated at Leeds Grammar School and qualified in 1829. He then became a partner of Atkinson Bolland & Atkinson, a well established practice at that time and with record of its existence from 1764. DLA can trace its Yorkshire roots back to 1764, when the firm of Barnard & Bolland was established in Leeds. The newly qualified Thomas Dibb became a partner at Barnard & Bolland and added his name in 1829.
The three-letter abbreviation used by the firm today – DLA –  conceals a complex history of consolidation and name changes. It picked up Lupton, from Nelson Eddison & Lupton in 1920. The firm merged with Broomhead of Sheffield in 1988.
The name of the firm as Dibb Lupton & Co. survived intact until the merger with Broomheads of Sheffield in 1988. Following the link with Alsop Wilkinson in 1996, the firm was then known as Dibb Lupton Alsop until around the year 2000, when the name was shortened to DLA.
It is now known internationally as DLA Piper.

Piper Rudnick and American predecessor firms

Piper Rudnick was the result of a 1999 merger between the Baltimore-based Piper & Marbury and Chicago-based Rudnick & Wolfe. At the time, the merger was the largest law firm merger in history. The combined firm was known as Piper Marbury Rudnick & Wolfe LLP until April 2002, when the firm shortened its name to Piper Rudnick LLP.

Piper Rudnick acquired the Washington, D.C.-based lobbying firm of Verner, Liipfert, Bernhard, McPherson and Hand in September 2002.

2005 to 2010

In July 2004, UK-based law firm DLA LLP and Baltimore-based law firm Piper Rudnick announced their intention to merge on 1 January 2005. DLA had been the result of a mid-1990s merger between three UK firms, Dibb Lupton Broomhead, Alsop Stevens, and Wilkinson Kimbers.

Piper Rudnick agreed to merge with San Diego-based law firm Gray Cary Ware & Freidenrich LLP in October 2004, forming a firm with around 1,300 lawyers and 20 offices across the United States.

In December 2004, DLA LLP, Gray Cary and Piper Rudnick, the latter two of which had yet to complete their merger, announced that the partners of each firm had approved a three-way merger. The merger became effective on 1 January 2005 and the new firm was named DLA Piper Rudnick Gray Cary. The merger was structured in the form of two limited liability partnerships, DLA Piper International LLP, and DLA Piper US LLP (since renamed to DLA Piper LLP (US)), which share a single management board but are not financially integrated.

In July 2005, DLA Piper acquired EY Law's 87 lawyer operation in the Commonwealth of Independent States, including offices in Moscow and St Petersburg. In December 2005 DLA Piper opened an office in Beijing, having recruited a team of lawyers from the Beijing office of Coudert Brothers.

In January 2006, DLA Piper opened its first office in the Middle East, in Dubai. The firm has since opened offices in Abu Dhabi, Cairo, Doha, Kuwait City, Manama, Muscat, Riyadh and Jeddah. On 1 September 2006, the firm shortened its name to DLA Piper. DLA Piper merged with its Norway-based alliance firm DLA Nordic in the same month, and formed an alliance with the Australia-based law firm Phillips Fox in November 2006, with Phillips Fox rebranding as DLA Phillips Fox at that time.

DLA Piper opened offices in Munich, Germany and Warsaw, Poland in 2007.

2010 to present

In February 2010, DLA Piper formed an alliance with the Turkish law firm Yüksel Karkın Küçük until 2014. In March 2010 DLA Piper formed an alliance with the Brazil-based law firm Campos Mello Advogados.

In January 2011, DLA Piper and DLA Phillips Fox announced their intention to merge. The merger was approved by partners of both firms in February and was completed on 1 May, when DLA Phillips Fox become part of DLA Piper International LLP. Later in the same month DLA Phillips Fox's former New Zealand-based offices separated to form an independent firm. DLA Piper formed an alliance with Venezuela-based law firm InterJuris Abogados in February 2011, which subsequently renamed as DLA Interjuris. In 2016, the Venezuelan firm exited the alliance with DLA Piper and reverted to operating under the name of InterJuris Abogados.

In February 2012, DLA Piper opened an office in Mexico City, having recruited a team from Thompson & Knight's office in the city.

In January 2013, DLA Piper announced the closure of its Glasgow office and the sale of its Manchester- and Sheffield-based defendant insurance practices to Hill Dickinson.

Also in January 2013, DLA Piper opened an office in Seoul in South Korea.

On 2 March 2015, DLA Phillips Fox New Zealand became DLA Piper New Zealand.

On 17 April 2015, Canadian law firm Davis LLP became DLA Piper (Canada) LLP.

On 13 October 2015, DLA Piper announced the opening of an office in Casablanca in Morocco.

On 1 November 2016, DLA Piper (Canada) LLP combined with Dimock Stratton LLP and will operate under the DLA Piper name.

An office opened in Johannesburg in January 2016.

The Danish firm LETT and the Portuguese firm ABBC joined DLA Piper in March 2017 which made DLA Piper the largest law firm in the Nordic region, with offices in Aarhus, Copenhagen, Helsinki, Oslo and Stockholm (DLA Piper has no offices in Iceland).

In late June 2017, The New York Times reported the firm had been hit in the ransomware cyberattack which infected their network. No information was compromised or lost. As of June 2017, the law firm was struggling to recover from "vicious computer attacks" from the week before.

In October 2017, Equifax selected DLA Piper to work on its security breach case in Washington, D.C.

In July 2018, DLA Piper formed an alliance with the Argentine-based law firm Cabanellas Etchebarne Kelly, founded in 1997. The new local firm was named DLA Piper Argentina.

Australasian history

In Australasia, the current company's history began with a firm known as PD Phillips.

1864 PD Phillips established a practice in Melbourne.
1884 Phillips Nicholson established in New Zealand.
1885 Smithers Warren Davenport Mant established in Sydney.
1888 Ross & McCarthy established in Adelaide.
1920s Seymour Nulty established in Brisbane.
1983 Lavan Solomon established in Perth.
1985 Phillips Fox & Masel, (previously known as PD Phillips), Smithers Warren Davenport Mant and Lavan Solomon form an association and agree to practise as a federation under the name Phillips Fox.
1990 Canberra office opens.
1991 Seymour Nulty in Brisbane joins Phillips Fox.
1992 Phillips Nicholson in New Zealand joins Phillips Fox, creating the first trans-Tasman law firm. Ross & McCarthy in Adelaide joins Phillips Fox.
1993 Hanoi office opens and the firm is the first in the world to be granted a licence to practise in Vietnam.Darvall McCutcheon merges with Phillips Fox in Melbourne. Darvall McCutcheon was itself the result of a merger in 1982 of Darvall & Hambleton and W B & O McCutcheon which had their origins in 1864 and 1888 respectively.
1997 Ho Chi Minh City office opens in Vietnam.
1999 Phillips Fox moves from being a federated group of offices to a fully integrated, corporately managed legal firm.
2006 On 20 November, Phillips Fox enters into an exclusive alliance with DLA Piper, one of the largest legal services organisations in the world, and becomes a member of the global DLA Piper Group under the name DLA Phillips Fox.
2011 On 1 May, DLA Phillips Fox (Australia) integrates with DLA Piper to become DLA Piper Australia. DLA Phillips Fox New Zealand remains an independent law firm closely allied to DLA Piper.
2015 On 2 March, DLA Phillips Fox (New Zealand) integrates with DLA Piper  to become DLA Piper New Zealand.

Offices 
DLA Piper is a polycentric firm with over 80 offices in more than 40 countries across the Americas, Asia Pacific, Australasia, Europe, Africa and the Middle East:

DLA Piper New Zealand is the first global, business law firm operating in New Zealand. with offices in Auckland and Wellington, DLA Piper New Zealand provides counsel to a range of private and public companies, central and local government entities, charities and other organisations.

Political contributions 
DLA Piper was the twelfth-largest donor to President Barack Obama's 2012 re-election campaign.  According to OpenSecrets, DLA Piper was one of the top law firms contributing to federal candidates during the 2012 election cycle, donating $2.19 million, 73% to Democrats.  By comparison, during that same period Akin Gump Strauss Hauer & Feld donated $2.56 million, 66% to Democrats, while oil conglomerate ExxonMobil donated $2.66 million, 88% to Republicans.  Since 1990, DLA Piper has contributed $16.97 million to federal campaigns, and spent over $1 million on lobbying since 2002.

Controversy
In 2010, DLA Piper represented Paul Ceglia in his claim that he hired Mark Zuckerberg to create a website that became Facebook and that under the agreement, Ceglia was entitled to ownership of 84 percent of Facebook, then worth multiple billions of dollars. Zuckerberg and Facebook responded that Ceglia had hired Zuckerberg to work on an unrelated site, but Ceglia had fraudulently altered that contract to make it appear to cover Facebook. A DLA Piper attorney told the Wall Street Journal that although he had not seen the original document, he had "absolutely 100% confidence that [Mr. Ceglia's] agreement is authentic." Ceglia's document was later found to be fraudulent, and in 2014, Facebook and Zuckerberg sued DLA Piper and others, claiming Ceglia's lawyers "knew or should have known that the [initial] lawsuit was a fraud." The suit was later dismissed.

In June 2020, Squire Patton Boggs filed Ferrellgas Partners LP et al. v. DLA Piper LLP US in Kansas, on behalf of former firm client Ferrellgas, for a breach of fiduciary duty.

Notable attorneys, advisors and staff
 José María Aznar, former Prime Minister of Spain, has been senior adviser to DLA Piper's Global Board since 2013
 James Blanchard, former Governor of Michigan and former U.S. Ambassador to Canada, has been partner since 1996
 Michael Castle, former Governor of Delaware, has been a partner at DLA Piper since 2011.
 Saxby Chambliss, former US Senator, has been partner since 2015
 Bart Chilton, former US Commodity Futures Trading Commissioner, was senior policy adviser from 2014 to 2017
Timothy Clement-Jones, Baron Clement-Jones, Liberal Democrat Peer and former spokesman for the Creative Industries in the House of Lords
 Douglas Emhoff, attorney, Second Gentleman of the United States and spouse of Vice President Kamala Harris
 Sir Nigel Knowles was managing partner from 1996 to 2015 and global co-chairman from 2015 to 2016.
 Ray LaHood, former secretary of the Department of Transportation, has been senior policy adviser since 2014
 Former US Senator George Mitchell was DLA Piper's chairman between 2003 and 2009 As of 2012, he is chairman emeritus.

Notable alumni
 Dick Armey, former U.S. Representative from Texas'  (1985–2003) and House Majority Leader (1995–2003)
 Rudi M. Brewster, former judge of the United States District Court for the Southern District of California
 Peter Bynoe, attorney and businessman who co-owned the Denver Nuggets
 Tom Daschle, former US Senator and US Senate Majority Leader,; policy adviser at DLA Piper, from December 2009 to October 2014.
 Steven J. Davis, earth system scientist at the University of California, Irvine
 Jared Genser, international human rights attorney
 Miriam González Durántez, partner at DLA Piper, from 2006 to 2011; spouse of former deputy prime minister of the United Kingdom, Nick Clegg
 A. B. Krongard, former executive director of the Central Intelligence Agency and former chairman and CEO of Alex. Brown & Sons
 Jonathan Lisle, British D.J.
 Mel Martinez, partner and lobbyist for DLA Piper, after retiring as a U.S. Senator from Florida, during 2009 to 2010; Florida chairman for J.P. Morgan Chase & Co; co-chair of the Bipartisan Policy Center
 Harry Cummings McPherson Jr., author, attorney and policymaker who served as counsel and special counsel to President Lyndon B. Johnson, from 1965 to 1969, and as his chief speechwriter, from 1966 to 1969
 Paul Victor Niemeyer, judge of the United States Court of Appeals for the Fourth Circuit and a former judge of the United States District Court for the District of Maryland
 Thomas C. Wheeler, judge of the United States Court of Federal Claims

References

External links 
 
 Official site
 DLA Phillips Fox and DLA Piper named International Tax Firm of the Year
 Lawyers Weekly article on the DLA alliance
 Article about a recent global survey into capital markets released by DLA Phillips Fox
 Lawyers Weekly article on new chairperson
 The Australian article about a young woman making partner at DLA Phillips Fox

Law firms of the United Kingdom
Law firms of the United States
Privately held companies of the United States
Foreign law firms with offices in Hong Kong
Foreign law firms with offices in Japan
Foreign law firms with offices in the Netherlands
Law firms established in 2005
2005 establishments in the United Kingdom
2005 establishments in the United States
Law firms based in London